Dumbrava is a commune located in Mehedinți County, Oltenia, Romania. It is composed of eleven villages: Albulești, Brâgleasa, Dumbrava de Jos, Dumbrava de Mijloc, Dumbrava de Sus, Golineasa, Higiu, Rocșoreni, Valea Marcului, Varodia and Vlădica.

References

Communes in Mehedinți County
Localities in Oltenia